Procanthia is a genus of moths in the subfamily Arctiinae. The genus was erected by George Hampson in 1900.

Species
 Procanthia distantii (Dewitz, 1881)
 Procanthia nivea Rothschild, 1910

References

Arctiinae
Moth genera
Taxa named by George Hampson